Lois January (October 5, 1913 – August 7, 2006) was an American actress and singer who performed small roles in several B-movies during the 1930s.

Early life
Born in McAllen, Texas, as Laura Lois January, she "was prodded into show business by her mother, whom Lois described as '"pushy.'" Her father, Charles, competed at the 1904 Summer Olympics. January attended Virgil Junior High School and the Marlborough School for girls. She also studied dance at the Denishawn School of Dancing and Related Arts and acted in stage productions in Los Angeles.

Career
January's first credited role was in 1933, in the short subject UM-PA. Her most famous role, however, is probably as the Emerald City manicurist in The Wizard of Oz who sings to Dorothy that "we can make a dimpled smile out of a frown". Although the character was unnamed, many fans believe it to be an incarnation of novel character Jellia Jamb.

During the 1930s she played in numerous westerns as the heroine, usually opposite Johnny Mack Brown, Bob Steele, Tim McCoy and Bob Baker, among others. In 1935 she starred opposite Reb Russell in Arizona Bad Man, and in 1936 she starred with Brown in Rogue of the Range, and alongside Tim McCoy in Border Caballero. While under contract with Universal Pictures she continued to play heroine roles in westerns, and in 1937 she starred opposite Bob Baker in Courage of the West. The reissuing of the 1935 exploitation film The Pace That Kills (under the title Cocaine Fiends) would eventually lend January even more exposure, however limited.

January's Broadway credits include High Kickers (1941) and Yokel Boy (1939) alongside Judy Canova and Buddy Ebsen..

By the mid-1940s, her starring roles had waned but she continued to act in non-starring parts. In 1942 she was the "poster girl" for Chesterfield cigarettes. 

From 1960 through 1987 she played numerous small roles on television, to include roles on My Three Sons, Marcus Welby, M.D. and Barnaby Jones. Her last acting role was in 1987, on the television movie Double Agent. During the 1980s she attended several western film festivals.

Personal life
In April 1937, January married theatrical agent Abraham Meyer. They were divorced August 9, 1940. She later married radio producer Bill Gernnant.

Filmography

Double Agent (1987) as a Dowager
The Little Shepherd of Kingdom Come (1961) as Mrs. Dean
The Wizard of Oz (1939) as Emerald City woman with cat
Life Returns (1938) as Nurse
Lightnin' Crandall (1937) as Sheila Shannon
Bar-Z Bad Men (1937) as Beth Harvey
The Red Rope (1937) as Betty Duncan
The Trusted Outlaw (1937) as Molly
The Roaming Cowboy (1937) as Jeanie
Courage of the West (1937) as Beth Andrews
Moonlight on the Range (1937) as Wanda Brooks
Border Caballero (1936) as Goldie Harris
Lightnin' Bill Carson (1936) as Dolores
Rogue of the Range (1936) as Stella [Lamb]
One Rainy Afternoon (1936) as Mr. Pelerin's secretary
Flying Hostess (1936) as Waitress
Easy to Take (1936) as Annie
Night Life of the Gods (1935) 
Stolen Harmony (1935) as Woman in sextet
Society Fever (1935) as Julie Prouty
Skull and Crown (1935) as Barbara Franklin
Arizona Bad Man (1935) as Lucy Dunstan
The Pace That Kills (1935) as Jane Bradford, also known as Lil
The Affair of Susan (1935) as Girl in candy shop
Splendor (1935) as Lena Limering
The Man Who Reclaimed His Head (1934)
Let's Be Ritzy (1934) as Stenographer
The Love Captive (1934) as Girl
Uncertain Lady (1934) as Maid
The Human Side (1934) as High school girl
The Black Cat (1934) as Cultist
Glamour (1934) as Chorus girl
Let's Talk It Over(1934) as Alice
By Candlelight (1933) as Ann

Death
January died in Los Angeles, California, of Alzheimer's disease on August 7, 2006, aged 92.

References

External links

B-western heroines, Lois January

Actresses from Texas
American film actresses
American television actresses
Deaths from dementia in California
Deaths from Alzheimer's disease
People from McAllen, Texas
People from Greater Los Angeles
1913 births
2006 deaths
20th-century American actresses
21st-century American women